Mohamed Riaz Farcy is a former cricketer from Hong Kong. A right-handed batsman and right-arm medium pace bowler, He played for the Hong Kong cricket team between 1993 and 1998.

Biography

Born in Hong Kong on 15 January 1967, Farcy played first-class cricket in Sri Lanka in 1989. He played three matches in the Lakspray Trophy for Colts Cricket Club and two for a Sri Lanka Board XI. He made his debut for Hong Kong in 1993, playing against Bangladesh. He then represented Hong Kong at the 1994 ICC Trophy in Nairobi.

Career

In 1996, he played for Hong Kong at the first ACC Trophy tournament and in the Hong Kong Sixes. He also played in the Tuanku Ja'afar Cup that year, setting the record for the highest score in the tournament's history when he scored 178 against Thailand. He represented Hong Kong in the 1997 ICC Trophy in Kuala Lumpur, winning the man of the match award after scoring a century against Italy.

He played in the Hong Kong Sixes a second time in 1997, and his last known appearance for Hong Kong was in the 1998 ACC Trophy, his last match being the semi-final against Malaysia.

References

1967 births
Living people
Hong Kong cricketers
Colts Cricket Club cricketers
Hong Kong people of Sri Lankan descent